Numismatic Guaranty Company (NGC) is an international third-party coin grading and  certification service based in Sarasota, Florida. It has certified more than 50 million coins. NGC certification consists of authentication, grading, attribution, and encapsulation in clear plastic holders. NGC is a subsidiary of Certified Collectibles Group (CCG), which owns six collectible certification services and is in turn owned by Blackstone, a multibillion dollar New York City hedge fund.

History
NGC was founded in 1987 in Parsippany, N.J. by John Albanese, who also founded Professional Coin Grading Service. A majority stake was later purchased by coin dealer Mark Salzberg. Along with CEO Steven Eichenbaum, Salzberg owns the CDN Greysheet, a price guide for coins similar to the Kelley Blue Book.
NGC commenced operations at its new location in Sarasota, Florida in 2002. In 2006, NGC relocated to a 60,000-square-foot secure building that also houses its CCG-owned sister companies, including Numismatic Conservation Services (NCS), Paper Money Guaranty (PMG), Certified Guaranty Company (CGC), Certified Sports Guaranty (CSG), and Classic Collectible Services (CCS). In 2008, ancient coin certification began (NGC Ancients). Other Salzberg family companies such as ModernCoinMart and GovMint are operated from the same location.
NGC has other locations in Hong Kong, China; Shanghai, China; Munich, Germany; and London, United Kingdom. In 2011 it was reported that Heritage Auctions owned 30% of NGC. Company President Max Spiegel's brother Sam Spiegel is the head of International Numismatics at Heritage Auctions. In 2021, owner Mark Salzberg's son Andrew (formerly of ModernCoinMart) was appointed Executive Vice President of NGC.

Claimed Endorsements

In 1995, NGC was named the official grading service of the ANA, though this is purely for marketing purposes as the ANA does not encapsulate coins in its collection, and those that are encapsulated are a mix of donated coins by different services including rivals such as PCGS. 

In 2004, NGC paid $120,000/year to be endorsed as the official grading service of the PNG. Similar to the ANA affiliation, this can be misleading as PNG dealers do not exclusively sell or endorse coins graded by NGC.

NGC certification

NGC certifies most US, world, and ancient coins, tokens, and medals. The certification process consists of authentication, grading, attribution, and encapsulation in plastic holders (aka slabs). Certification fees are tiered according to value, turnaround times, and extra services. NGC has certified over 50 million coins. NGC certification offers significant protection against counterfeiting, misattribution, overgrading, and damage, but does not necessarily determine exact value. Even within the same grade, coins can have widely differing values. In the May 26, 2003 edition of Coin World, the hobby newspaper had announced they had contracted investigators to conduct a year-long, comparative study of PCGS, ACCGS, and NGC, along with several other grading services, each known as Third Party Grader (TPG). In their investigation, Coin World sent the same coins to each grading service over the course of a year, each coin being graded by all Third Party Graders it was sent to.  They found that "In no case did the grading services agree on the grade of any given coin, and in some cases the difference in grading was as much as seven points off".

The NGC grading scale is based on the 70-point Sheldon coin grading scale. Strike designations include Prooflike and Deep Prooflike for circulation issue coins and Cameo and Ultra Cameo for Proof coins. Coins deemed high-end for their particular numeric grade receive a "Plus" designation. Coins considered attractive get a "Star" moniker. Cleaned, scratched, or otherwise impaired coins can be encapsulated and assigned a verbal "details" grade, but not a numerical one. Additional information is also given for graded and labelled mules and mint errors, specifying the particular error in addition to a numerical grade.

NGC has used EdgeView Holders since 2007 for the Presidential Dollar series and for all other coins since 2008. Since 2009, a scratch-resistant holder coating, similar to that used on eyeglass lenses, has been employed. NGC offers Oversize holders for coins larger than 45 mm and up to 120 mm, and Mega holders for coins larger than 120 mm and up to 180 mm. NGC's label lists a coin's denomination, variety, grade, pedigree, serial number, and other info.

Online research tools
NGC Cert Lookup verifies all NGC certified coins and helps combat against holder counterfeiting. Using the label serial number, NGC will reveal a coin's date, denomination, grade, photo (if any), and pricing and Census info. NGC Coin Explorer lists key info about many coin issues, such as mintages and values. The NGC Census reports how many examples of each issue NGC has certified by grade, which helps determine relative rarity. Census figures are often falsely inflated due to resubmissions of the same coins. NGC Coin Price Guide lists pricing data for most US coin (and some modern Chinese) issues. NGC Auction Central reports
auction prices realized.

Controversies

Since at least 2016, NGC has been frequently criticized for its slow and unpredictable grading times  and misattributed holders.

In 2018, in what is termed the "Red Dragon Incident" (zh: 红龙事件), CEO Steven Eichenbaum (a former Tennis camp director) hired supposed Taiwanese numismatic expert Chen Gi-Mao, who encapsulated hundreds of fake Chinese coins in NGC holders. Some of these had a Red Dragon on the label and are easy to identify. NGC coins often fail to achieve high market prices compared to rival PCGS as a result.

External links 
Official site

References

Coin grading
Companies established in 1987